Augustus Solberg Marker (August 1, 1905 – October 7, 1997) was a Canadian professional ice hockey right winger who had played ten seasons in the National Hockey League (NHL) for the Detroit Red Wings, Montreal Maroons, Toronto Maple Leafs and Brooklyn Americans between 1932 and 1942.

Playing career
In 336 NHL games Marker scored 64 goals, 69 assists for 133 points in his career.

Career notes
Marker was the last surviving member of the Montreal Maroons 1935 Stanley Cup championship team.
Marker played in the longest hockey game in NHL history while a member of the Montreal Maroons. A Stanley Cup playoff game on March 24, 1936, when the Detroit Red Wings defeated the Maroons 1-0 in the sixth overtime period.

Retirement
After retiring from professional hockey, Marker settled in Kingston, Ontario. He operated a building materials business, and helped develop a subdivision in the northern section of the city. The subdivision was originally called Marker's Acres and paid homage to two of his most respected team mates with the naming of Conacher Drive and Morenz Crescent. He became a member of the Kiwanis Club in Kingston, and an enthusiastic booster of amateur sport in the region. Since 1980, the Kiwanis Club of Kingston has presented awards, including the Gus Marker Trophy, to honour outstanding amateur athletes in the city and district. Past winners of the Gus Marker Trophy have included boxer Mark Leduc (1992), hockey players Alyn McCauley (1996) and Jayna Hefford (1997), golfer Matt McQuillan (1999), and triathlete Simon Whitfield (2000).

Career statistics

Regular season and playoffs

Awards and achievements
1935 Stanley Cup Champion (Montreal Maroons)

References

External links

1905 births
1997 deaths
Brooklyn Americans players
Canadian expatriate ice hockey players in the United States
Canadian ice hockey right wingers
Detroit Olympics (IHL) players
Detroit Red Wings players
Ice hockey people from Alberta
Montreal Maroons players
People from Wetaskiwin
Springfield Indians players
Stanley Cup champions
Toronto Maple Leafs players
Tulsa Oilers (AHA) players